Aușeu is a commune in Bihor County, Crișana, Romania with a population of 3,033 people. It is composed of six villages: Aușeu, Cacuciu Vechi (Kiskakucs), Codrișoru (Szekatura), Gheghie (Körösgégény), Groși (Tőtös), and Luncșoara (Élesdlok).

Geography
The commune is located in the eastern part of Bihor County,  from the county seat, Oradea, on the border with Sălaj County. It lies on the banks of the Crișul Repede River, at the confluence with its right tributaries, Borod, Pârâul Omului, and Gepiș.

Demographics
At the 2011 census, 83.9% of inhabitants were Romanians, 8.8% Roma, and 5.6% Slovaks. Of those inhabitants, 77.7% were Romanian Orthodox, 8.5% Pentecostal, 6.3% Baptist, and 5.9% Roman Catholic.

Zichy Hunting Castle
In 1904, the castle was transformed into a hunting lodge by Ödön Zichy. At the end of World War I, the estate was bought by Gheorghe Mateescu, a boyar from Muntenia. After World War II, the castle was nationalized by the Communist regime; from 1950 to 2006, it served as a sanatorium for tuberculosis patients.

Natives
 Alexandru Roman (1826–1897), cultural figure, journalist, and a founding member of the Romanian Academy.

References

Communes in Bihor County
Localities in Crișana